Dooboobetic is a locality in Victoria, Australia, located approximately 19 km from Donald, Victoria.

References

Towns in Victoria (Australia)